Fahnbullah Eddy, also known as Gorilla Girl, is a fictional superheroine appearing in American comic books published by Marvel Comics.

Publication history

Gorilla Girl first appeared in Marvel Team-Up #91 (March 1980), and was created by Steven Grant and Pat Broderick.

Fictional character biography
Fahnbullah Eddy, originally known as Gorilla Woman, worked at a carnival as a member of the Freaks, a group of circus freaks that included Muck Monster and Six. When the Freaks fell under the control of the sorcerer Moondark, he forced them to battle Spider-Man. Gorilla Girl and the Freaks were later seen in a fight against the criminals Hammer and Anvil.

After the events of the "Civil War", Gorilla Girl was captured by the Thunderbolts. During her capture, she threw Penance down three flights of stairs, after which Penance beat her severely. She later registered with the Initiative and joined Camp Hammond along with Annex, Prodigy, and others.

During the Skrull invasion, she is one of the Initiative members to go into battle in Times Square. They join the 'Young Avengers' and are saved by the 'Secret Commandos'. Afterwards, Gorilla Girl asked to be put in the Initiative reserves. However, before she gets very far, the Thor clone attacks Camp Hammond, and Gorilla Girl fights him before Counter Force intervenes.

Gorilla Girl strikes up a friendship with the alternate universe simian version of Speedball, another Initiative recruit. She becomes involved in the plan of Norman Osborn to exploit the resources of her friend's home dimension. The two also work with Gibbon (another simian superhuman) as well as Red Ghost's Super-Apes.

When Gorilla Girl, the simian Speedball, and Gibbon ended up in the Marvel Apes universe, they find themselves in the midst of an invasion by the Marvel Zombies. Gorilla Girl shifted into her gorilla form and ripped off Zombie Medusa's hair to protect them. Just as they were about to be overwhelmed, a group of Marvel Apes appeared and helped to fight the Marvel Zombies. Gorilla Girl thinks that the simian version of Captain America can get them back to the Marvel Apes universe. Using the Wrencher, Gorilla Girl was able to destroy the Zombie Green Goblin. When Zombie Doctor Doom proved too much for Gorilla Girl, the Super-Apes were able to defeat them. Upon encountering a human Magneto, the simian Speedball figures out that they are in the Marvel Zombies universe. As Ape X plans to destroy the portal, he says goodbye to Gorilla Girl. However, Gorilla Girl kneed him when his guard was down so that she could go in his place. Using the Wrencher's wrench, Gorilla Girl attacked the simian heroes and destroyed the portal, setting time right.

Powers and abilities
Fahnbullah Eddy is able to shapeshift into a super-strong and highly agile gorilla. Even in her gorilla form, she can speak and think.

In other media
Gorilla Girl appears as a playable character in Lego Marvel's Avengers, voiced by Cherise Boothe.

References

External links
 Gorilla Girl at Marvel Wiki
 Gorilla Girl at Comic Vine
 
 

African-American superheroes
Characters created by Pat Broderick
Comics characters introduced in 1980
Fictional therianthropes
Gorilla characters in comics
Marvel Comics characters who are shapeshifters
Marvel Comics characters with superhuman strength
Marvel Comics female superheroes